Dave L. Karmol is a former member of the Ohio House of Representatives. He was appointed to fill the seat of his mother Irma Karmol, following her death in April 1979. He was elected for a full term in November 1980.

References

1950s births
Members of the Ohio House of Representatives
Living people